Vantour Club Mangoungou is a Gabonese football club based in Libreville. They play in the Gabon Championnat National D2.

In 1976 the team won the Gabon Championnat National D1.

Honours
Gabon Championnat National D1: 1976, 1977
Coupe du Gabon Interclubs: 1988

Stadium
Currently the team plays at the Stade Augustin Monédan de Sibang.

References

External links

Football clubs in Gabon